A timeline of notable events relating to BBC Radio 2, a British national radio station which began broadcasting in September 1967.

1960s

1967
30 September – BBC Radio 2 launches at 5:30am, replacing  the BBC Light Programme. Paul Hollingdale, Kenneth Alwyn, Eric Robinson, Cliff Adams, Pat Doody, Barry Alldis, Teddy Johnson, Brian Matthew, David Jacobs, Ray Moore, Alberto Semprini, Humphrey Lyttelton, Sam Costa, Alan Dell, David Gell, Benny Green, Pete Murray, David Hamilton, and John Dunn all join.
Friday Night Is Music Night, The Sunday Hour, Sing Something Simple, Mrs Dale's Diary, Woman's Hour, Round the Horne, Parade of the Pops  and Family Favourites are all transferred from the Light Programme to Radio 2. The Radio 2 Breakfast Show begins.

1968
Tom Edwards, Bob Holness, Michael Aspel, Charlie Chester, Katie Boyle and David Allan join.
9 June – Round the Horne broadcasts for the final time.
Parade of the Pops broadcasts for the final time.

1969
25 April – Mrs Dale's Diary broadcasts for the final time.
28 April – The first edition of soap opera Waggoners' Walk is broadcast.
11 June – The Organist Entertains, presented by Robin Richmond, is broadcast for the first time, as Richmond himself joins the station. 
Dance Band Days is broadcast for the first time.

1970s

1970
Des Lynam, Peter Clayton, Alan Keith, and Tony Brandon join.
3 April – Any Questions is broadcast on BBC Radio 2 for the final time.
4 April – Following the transfer of BBC Radio's sports coverage from BBC Radio 3 to BBC Radio 2, the first edition of Sport on 2 is broadcast.
5 April – Your Hundred Best Tunes moves to the station from BBC Radio 4.
The first voice heard on BBC Radio 2, Paul Hollingdale, leaves.
The first edition of Folk on 2 is broadcast as Jim Lloyd himself joins the station.

1971
August – Eric Robinson hosts Melodies for You for the final time, as he leaves the station.
4 November – BBC Radio 2 (and BBC Radio 4) begin broadcasting in stereo in South East England. Stereo was rolled out to the rest of the country over subsequent years.
Kenneth Alwyn replaces Eric Robinson as host of Melodies for You.
Pat Doody leaves.

1972
3 April – Terry Wogan joins, to present The Radio 2 Breakfast Show. He replaces John Dunn, who moves to afternoons. Breakfast Special disappears from the airwaves and a new early morning show is introduced, resulting in BBC Radio 2 starting the day on weekdays and Saturdays 30 minutes earlier, at 5am – Sunday broadcasting still commenced at just before 7am.
1 October – Sam Costa replaces Kenneth Alwyn as host of Melodies for You. Kenneth had hosted the show since the start of the year as Kenneth himself leaves the station.

1973
2 July – Woman's Hour is transferred to BBC Radio 4 and Jimmy Young joins the station.
Colin Berry joins the station as an announcer, newsreader and occasional presenter, and David Hamilton leaves for a while.
Simon Bates joins, and Barry Alldis leaves.

1974
29 September – David Jacobs replaces Sam Costa as host of Melodies for You.

1975
6 January – Broadcasting hours are reduced due to budget cuts at the BBC. The former 5:00–2:00 schedule is reduced to a 6:00 start up Mondays to Saturdays, 6:55 on Sundays, and an earlier closedown time of around 12:33 each day. The cuts also see the weekday afternoon show, presented by David Hamilton, broadcast on both BBC Radio 1 and BBC Radio 2, as David himself rejoins the station.
29 September – 
The station closes slightly earlier, concluding its day at around 12:10 Mondays to Fridays, and at 12:33 on Saturdays and Sundays.  
BBC Radio 2 stops being available on VHF/FM for an hour on weeknights when it lends its VHF/FM frequencies to BBC Radio 1 between 11pm and midnight. Previously, it had been available on Long Wave only (apart from some VHF simulcasts on BBC Local Radio stations) between 10pm and midnight between October 1971 and December 1974, when various progressive rock shows on BBC Radio 1 were given the higher-quality waveband.

1976
January – Simon Bates leaves the station to join BBC Radio 1.
4 October – John Dunn replaces Sam Costa as host of the drivetime programme. 
Sarah Kennedy joins.

1977
4 April – From tonight, BBC Radio 1 'borrows' BBC Radio 2's VHF/FM frequencies for two hours each weeknight – between 10pm and midnight.
28 November – David Hamilton's afternoon show is now heard on BBC Radio 2 only following the withdrawal of the 1975 economy measures.
Sheila Tracy joins, and David Gell leaves.

1978
Bill Rennells joins.
Brian Matthew takes BBC Radio 2's Round Midnight for the first time.  
1 April – Broadcasting hours are extended to a 5am2am schedule when the budget restrictions were eased, and the pre 1975 broadcasting hours are reintroduced.
23 November – 
Radio 2 moves from 1500m (200 kHz) long wave to 433 & 330m (693 & 909 kHz) medium wave as part of a plan to improve national AM reception, and to conform with the Geneva Frequency Plan of 1975. 
The shipping forecast transfers from BBC Radio 2 to BBC Radio 4 so that the forecast can continue to be broadcast on long wave.
22 December – Industrial action at the BBC by the ABS union, which started the previous day, extends to radio when the radio unions join their television counterparts by going on strike, forcing the BBC to merge its four national radio networks into one national radio station from 4pm and called it the BBC All Network Radio Service. The strike is settled shortly before 10pm on Friday 22 December 1978, with the unions and BBC management reaching an agreement at the British government's industrial disputes arbitration service ACAS.

1979
Steve Jones joins.
27 January – BBC Radio 2 closes down for the final time, and at 5am Radio 2 begins continuous broadcasting 24-hours with You and the Night and the Music filling the overnight hours.
September – Big Band Special broadcasts for the first time.

1980s

1980
13 January – Family Favourites is broadcast for the final time.
3 March – Nigel Ogden replaces Robin Richmond as host of The Organist Entertains, as Nigel himself joins the station.
30 May – The final edition of soap opera Waggoners' Walk is broadcast.
Ed Stewart joins the station to present the weekday afternoon programme.
Robin Richmond leaves.

1981
4 October – All Time Greats with Desmond Carrington is broadcast for the first time, as Desmond himself joins the station.
Sam Costa leaves.
Gloria Hunniford, Charles Nove, and Kenny Everett join.

1982
Stuart Hall joins, and Alberto Semprini leaves.
3 December – BBC Radio 2 is simulcast on BBC Radio 1 for the final time.

1983
4 January – BBC Radio 2 revives Music While You Work.
12 February – Sounds of the 60s is broadcast for the first time a new programme dedicated to hits of the 60s, The show is presented by Keith Fordyce.
Peter Dickson joins, Kenny Everett leaves the station to rejoin Capital London, and Ed Stewart & Sarah Kennedy both leave for a while.

1984
15 January – Pete Murray presents his final show as he leaves the station.
20 January – Ahead of changes to the schedule, following the decision not to renew the contract of long standing presenter Ed Stewart, the year-long revival of Music While You Work ends and Gloria Hunniford takes over Ed's slot the following week. Steve Jones replaces Hunniford on the lunchtime show. 
21 January – Overnight changes see the return of  Nightride, replacing You and the Night and the Music, and Ken Bruce becomes a regular presenter as he joins the station when he takes over as the new host of the Saturday late-night show.
22 January – Sounds of Jazz moves to BBC Radio 2 from BBC Radio 1.
29 April – BBC Radio 2 launches a summer sports and entertainment programme. Called Summer Sounds, the programme mixes sports coverage with music, guests and entertainment. The programme is broadcast MW only with the usual Sunday afternoon schedule continuing on VHF/FM. Previously, Sunday sports coverage had been restricted to a 30-minute early evening round-up programme.
28 December – Terry Wogan ends his first run as presenter of The Radio 2 Breakfast Show, as he leaves the station for a while.
Tom Edwards leaves, and Martin Kelner and Canon Roger Royle join.

1985
7 January – Ken Bruce takes over The Radio 2 Breakfast Show from Terry Wogan, and David Jacobs, who had presented Melodies for You since 1974, launches a new weekday lunchtime programme consisting mainly of tracks from musical theatre called My Kind of Music.  He replaces Steve Jones who takes over the Saturday late show slot vacated by Bruce although by July, Martin Kelner had taken over the slot. 
13 January – Robin Boyle replaces David Jacobs as host of Melodies for You.
28 September – A Little Night Music is broadcast for the first time. Airing daily between 3am and 4am, it replaces repeats of programmes previous broadcast on Radio 2. Instead of having a regular or named host, the programme is presented by that night's newsreader.
BBC Radio 2 changes the format of Sounds of the 60s. The show is no longer hosted by a single presenter and instead a different artist from the era presents the programme each week.
Steve Jones and Tony Brandon leave, and Chris Stuart, Steve Madden, Derek Jameson, and Angela Rippon join.

1986
Alan Dedicoat and Paul Jones join.
7 April – 
Derek Jameson takes over The Radio 2 Breakfast Show from Ken Bruce, who moves to mid-mornings.
The weekday daytime schedule gives way to evening programmes an hour earlier, at 7:00.
13 April – Richard Baker replaces Robin Boyle as host of Melodies for You, as Richard himself joins the station.
May – BBC Radio 2's summer Sunday afternoon sports and entertainment programme Summer Sounds is renamed Sunday Sport. The  show now has a greater emphasis on sports coverage although music remains part of the mix. 
December – David Hamilton leaves. He says that his reason for going is because the music policy had become “geriatric” following a repositioning of the station, under the influence of new Head of Music Frances Line, to appeal to over 50s with a playlist of nostalgia, easy listening and light music.

1987
Alex Lester and Adrian Love join.

1988
January – Sport bulletins are broadcast at breakfast for the first time. Previously, apart from a racing bulletin, sports news did not commence until lunchtime.
Chris Stuart replaces Ray Moore as presenter of the early show when the latter becomes ill suffering from cancer, as Ray himself leaves the station before his death next year. Moore had presented the show since 1980; Stuart, previously a breakfast show presenter on BBC Radio Wales, has often covered for Moore since 1985. Graham Knight joins the station to present the weekend early shows.
29 September – BBC Radio 1 'borrows' BBC Radio 2's FM frequencies on a weeknight for the final time following the start of a programme of switching on transmitters to allow BBC Radio 1 to broadcast full-time on FM which, at this time, was available to 2/3 of the UK.
Simon Dee, Anne Robinson, and Billy Butler join, and Stuart Hall leaves.

1989
Peter Dickson leaves.
Simon Dee presents Sounds of the 60s for the first half of the year.
1 October – BBC Radio 2 begins a series of Sunday afternoon performances of works by Gilbert and Sullivan. The 12-week series, which runs until Christmas, replaces the station's usual Sunday afternoon schedule.
30 December – BBC Radio 1 'borrows' BBC Radio 2's FM frequencies on a Saturday afternoon for the final time.

1990s

1990
6 January – BBC Radio 2 becomes available on FM on Saturday afternoons for the first time. A new music schedule is created, with Katie Boyle presenting a two-hour programme, while sport continues on MW. 
24 March – Martin Kelner leaves for a while.
25 March – At 7pm BBC Radio 2 becomes available on FM 24/7 for the first time after the final ever ‘borrow’ of its FM frequencies by BBC Radio 1. 
29 March – Ahead of major changes to BBC Radio 2’s output, Brian Matthew goes Round Midnight for the final time.
31 March – 
Sounds of the 50s, presented by Ronnie Hilton, is launched, a new programme dedicated to hits of the 50s and Brian Matthew takes over as host of Sounds of the 60s.
2 April – The changes to weekday programming begin today. Ken Bruce launches a new late night programme with Judith Chalmers joining the station to replacing Ken at mid-mornings, a weeknight late night jazz show called Jazz Parade is launched as a replacement for Sounds of Jazz and a weekday guest afternoon slot is introduced featuring a different personality choosing their favourite music each week.
6 April – The first edition of The Arts Programme is broadcast. The programme airs on Friday, Saturday and Sunday evenings between 10pm and midnight.
8 July – Wimbledon is broadcast on BBC Radio 2 MW for the final time. From next year, the event will be broadcast on BBC Radio 5.
15 August – BBC Radio 2 begins to wind down its transmissions on MW ahead of the launch of BBC Radio 5, which will occupy BBC Radio 2's MW frequencies, by broadcasting a daytime information service providing advice about how to listen to Radio 2 on FM. 
25 August – Sport on 2 is broadcast for the final time.
26 August – Sport is aired on BBC Radio 2 for the final time when the final sports bulletin on Radio 2 is broadcast at 10:02pm.
27 August – At midnight, BBC Radio 2 stops broadcasting on MW, thereby becoming the first national radio station in the UK to broadcast only on FM.
16 September – The Sunday Hour is revamped. Instead of coming from a different church each week, the show now becomes a studio-based programme with Roger Royle as presenter.
Don Maclean and Fran Godfrey join, and Simon Dee, and Billy Butler leave.

1991
20 December – Derek Jameson leaves The Radio 2 Breakfast Show after presenting it for five years. and the final weekday lunchtime serving of Our Kind of Music takes place.
25 December – Norma Major, the wife of Prime Minister John Major, was a guest presenter on BBC Radio 2, where she had presented a programme playing some of her favourite seasonal music.
Peter Clayton and Graham Knight leave, Brian Hayes and John Sachs join, and Ed Stewart rejoins.

1992
6 January – In a major shake-up of the daytime schedule, Brian Hayes takes over as host of The Radio 2 Breakfast Show from Derek Jameson who moves to a new late evening slot to launch a new show, co-presented by his wife Ellen who joins the station. Ken Bruce returns to the mid-morning show following Judith Chalmers’ departure and Ed Stewart, who rejoined the station the previous year, takes over as the mid-afternoon presenter. Weekend changes see Melodies for You move to early evenings and Barbara Sturgeon replaces Graham Knight as presenter of the weekend early shows, as Barbara herself joins the station. The weekday music policy is slightly adjusted; Sunday afternoon output is branded Vintage Years, while John Sachs presents a Sunday morning show with a comparatively modern playlist compared to most of the station's other output at the time.
April – Alex Lester becomes the permanent early morning presenter (a slot previously hosted on rotation by the station's announcers and newsreaders) and in July Steve Madden becomes the permanent overnight presenter, a slot which had similarly been hosted by the presentation team on rotation since the late 1970s.
28 June – BBC Radio 2 provides fifteen hours of coverage of the first annual National Music Day, presented by Ken Bruce.
23 December – Brian Hayes presents The Radio 2 Breakfast Show for the final time.
Keith Fordyce and Teddy Johnson leave, and Nick Barraclough joins.

1993
4 January – Terry Wogan returns to the station with Wake Up to Wogan and Sarah Kennedy also returns to the station to take over the early show, which later becomes known as The Dawn Patrol.
3 April – Shortly after midnight BBC Radio 2 airs the final edition of its weeknight jazz programme, Jazz Parade. The programme is presented by Digby Fairweather and features the BBC Big Band conducted by Barry Forgie.
Bill Rennells, Barbara Sturgeon, John Sachs, and Anne Robinson leave.

1994
Adrian Love leaves.
1 October – Martin Kelner rejoins after four years away to present a Saturday afternoon programme and to stand in for other presenters. This show, along with documentaries and concerts broadcast after it, represents a tentative attempt to appeal more to the "Beatles generation", which the station is encouraged to appeal to in the 'People and Programmes' report published in February 1995.

1995
21 April – Gloria Hunniford leaves the station after 11 years of broadcasting.
12 June – Debbie Thrower joins the station, replacing Gloria Hunniford as the new weekday early afternoon presenter.
1 July – Mo Dutta joins the station to present weekend early morning programmes.
 27 September – BBC Radio 2 begins to broadcast digitally following the commencement by the BBC of regular Digital Audio Broadcasting, from the Crystal Palace transmitting station.
October – Following the death of Alan Dell, Malcolm Laycock becomes presenter of Dance Band Days as Malcolm himself joins the station.
19 November – Although he is still billed in Radio Times until 10 December, Charlie Chester is likely to have presented his last BBC Radio 2 show on this day, before he had a stroke after which he could not walk or speak.
Frank Renton joins.

1996
Pam Ayres and Michael Parkinson join, including the launch of Parkinson's Sunday Supplement.
March – Jim Moir replaces Frances Line as controller and begins repositioning the station to attract a wider audience of over 35s, many of whom have moved to commercial radio following the repositioning of BBC Radio 1 three years earlier. He introduces a daytime playlist consisting of AOR/contemporary music with specialist programmes airing during the evening and at the weekend. Nostalgic/easy listening music is on to Sundays only. The move is successful and people flock to the station and shortly after BBC Radio 2 replaces BBC Radio 1 as the most listened to station in the UK.
30 March – Steve Wright joins the station, to present weekend mid-morning shows. including the launch of Sunday Love Songs.
July – Hugh Scully takes over as presenter of Melodies for You.
6 October – The first edition of The David Jacobs Collection is broadcast on Sunday evenings.
29 November – Martin Kelner, Chris Stuart, Wally Whyton, and Katie Boyle leave.

1997
29 March – Bob Harris joins, to present a Saturday late night programme “for the discerning music fan”.
3 April – Derek and Ellen Jameson present their late night programme for the final time, as they leave the station. Richard Allinson joins the station, and takes over the late show from the following Monday.
5 April – Pick of the Pops returns to the BBC. The programme is aired on Saturday afternoons with Alan Freeman returning and joining the station as the host. The programme had last been on BBC Radio 1 at the end of 1992 and throughout most of the intervening period it had been broadcast on Capital London.
31 August – Regular scheduled programming on the BBC's radio and television stations was abandoned to provide ongoing news coverage of the death of Diana, Princess of Wales. BBC Radio 2 airs a special programme from BBC Radio News, which is also carried on BBC Radio 1, BBC Radio 3, BBC Radio 4, and BBC Radio 5 Live. BBC Radio 2 broadcasts live coverage of the funeral six days later.
Angela Rippon leaves, and Mike Harding joins.
Robbie Vincent joins, but later leaves.
The final edition of Folk on 2 is broadcast as Jim Lloyd himself leaves the station.

1998
Stuart Maconie, Paul Gambaccini, Jools Holland, and Mark Lamarr join, and Benny Green, Debbie Thrower, and Bob Holness leave.
16 February – PopMaster quiz feature of Ken Bruce's mid-morning show on BBC Radio 2 is first broadcast.
13 April – Dance Band Days is broadcast for the final time.
2 October – John Dunn presents his final drivetime show after 22 years of broadcasting, as he retires from radio broadcasting due to ill health.
5 October – A major overhaul of the schedule sees many new faces joining the network, including the singer Katrina Leskanich, Jackie Bird, and former BBC Radio 1 presenters Lynn Parsons, and Andy Peebles who present overnight shows on weekdays and weekends respectively, replacing Steve Madden and Charles Nove. Johnnie Walker joins the station as a regular presenter hosting the afternoon drivetime show (Monday to Thursday) with Des Lynam presenting the show on Fridays. Sally Boazman joins, and becomes the station's first official travel news presenter for weekday afternoons, and Bob Harris takes over a relaunched weekly country music programme from David Allan.

1999
David Allan, Pam Ayres, and Michael Aspel leave, Jonathan Ross joins, and Bobbie Pryor also joins the station as the station's first official travel news presenter for weekends.
26 April – Johnnie Walker was suspended from his drivetime show and the station after allegations concerning a drug problem appeared in the Sunday tabloid, the News of the World. Richard Allinson presents the drivetime show during Walker's absence, while Tom Robinson stands in on his Saturday afternoon show.
26 June – Janice Long joins.
2 July – Ed Stewart hosts his final weekday afternoon show as he moves to weekends.
5 July – Steve Wright in the Afternoon returns to radio after a break of several years away, as Steve Wright replaces Ed Stewart.
July – Following his move to ITV, Des Lynam leaves.
1 August – Richard Baker begins his second stint as host of Melodies for You.
2 August – It is announced that ITV has signed BBC sports presenter Des Lynam on a four-year contract to become the TV station's main football presenter. This means he will no longer present his Friday drivetime show.
14 October – Managers at BBC Radio 2 reinstate Johnnie Walker after he is fined £2,000 by magistrates for admitting possession of cocaine. He will return to the airwaves on 6 December.
6 December – Johnnie Walker returns to the station after being suspended.

2000s

2000
Sounds of the 70s is broadcast for the first time, a new Radio 2 show dedicated to the hits of the 70s. and is presented by singer Steve Harley.
February – BBC Radio 2 presents its first annual BBC Radio 2 Folk Awards.
3 April – Janice Long begins presenting the night time show.
21 October – comedian Jack Docherty joins the station to host Saturday Night Jack. The show lasts three months.
Dale Winton joins, and replaces Alan Freeman as host of Pick of the Pops from 8 April, as Alan himself retires from radio broadcasting due to ill health. 
Jackie Bird, Sheila Tracy and Katrina Leskanich leave, and Lynn Bowles joins, becoming the station's first official travel news presenter for weekday mornings.

2001
10 May – For the first time, BBC Radio 2 becomes the UK's most listened to radio station, overtaking BBC Radio 1. It has held that position ever since.
1 October – BBC Radio 2 starts broadcasting a weekly album chart show. The one-hour programme was broadcast on Monday evenings and was presented by Simon Mayo who joins the station.
25 November – After 42 years on air, Sing Something Simple broadcasts for the final time.
Jack Docherty and Cliff Adams leave.

2002
Andy Peebles leaves.
11 March – Sister station BBC Radio 6 Music launches.
20 December – Sir Jimmy Young presents his final lunchtime programme after 50 years of broadcasting, as he leaves the station, (as Jimmy himself retires from radio broadcasting).

2003
Sybil Ruscoe joins, and Alan Keith hosts his final Your Hundred Best Tunes show and leaves the station before his death.
6 January – Jeremy Vine joins the station, and takes over the lunchtime show from Sir Jimmy Young.
March – Richard Baker takes over as host of Your Hundred Best Tunes following the death of Alan Keith. Brian Kay briefly replaces Richard as host of Melodies for You with Sheridan Morley taking over the show the following year.
5 June – Johnnie Walker announces that he will be taking time off air for a while to undergo treatment after being diagnosed with non-Hodgkin's lymphoma. During his time away the show will be presented by Stuart Maconie and Noel Edmonds (who made a brief return to radio).

2004
5 January – Lesley Douglas succeeds James Moir as Controller.
1 March – Johnnie Walker returns to his drivetime show, and the station following a nine-month break away, while he received treatment for cancer.
7 June – Mark Radcliffe joins, and takes over the late show from Richard Allinson
28 August – The weekly edition of Pick of the Pops with Dale Winton ends although bank holiday editions of the show continue to be broadcast.
29 August – Desmond Carrington presents his last weekend edition of All Time Greats, as he moves to weekdays to present The Music Goes Round on Tuesday later Friday nights.
4 September – Dermot O'Leary joins, and starts hosting his Saturday afternoon show.
5 September – Elaine Paige joins, and starts hosting her Sunday lunchtime movies and musicals show Elaine Paige on Sunday, replacing Desmond Carrington who moves to Tuesday later Friday evenings.
Sybil Ruscoe leaves.

2005
18 September – A year after BBC Radio 2 stopped broadcasting a weekly edition of Pick of the Pops, the programme returns on a regular basis on Sunday afternoons with Dale Winton returning as host. 
Chris Evans joins, and takes over Saturday afternoons.

2006
Aled Jones and Matthew Wright join, and Don Maclean and Brian Hayes leave.
28 February – Johnnie Walker announces he will leave the Drivetime show after seven years. He will present his last show at the end of March, as Johnnie himself moves to weekends to replace Ed Stewart on Sunday afternoons. He will present his final programme on 31 March.
31 March – Johnnie Walker steps down from drivetime hosting.
16 April – Ed Stewart presents his final Sunday afternoon show as he leaves the station for a while. 
18 April – Chris Evans takes over the Drivetime show from Johnnie Walker, and Jonny Saunders & Rebecca Pike both join.
Pete Mitchell and Clare Teal join.
26 August – Brian Matthew takes a break from his radio broadcasting for while due to a viral infection illness.
18 November – Russell Brand joins the station to present a regular weekly programme.

2007
21 January – Your Hundred Best Tunes is broadcast for the final time. The programme ended after 47 years on air and was replaced a week later by Melodies for You with Alan Titchmarsh joining the station to present the programme.
10 February – Brian Matthew returns.
4 April – Bob Harris announces he will take a break from his shows for a while, when he receives treatment for prostate cancer.
8 April – Roger Royle presents his The Sunday Hour programme for the final time, after 17 years as the programme's host as he leaves and retires from the station. He is replaced the following week by Brian D’Arcy, as Brian himself joins the station.
16 April – The first Radcliffe and Maconie Show presented by Mark Radcliffe and Stuart Maconie is aired on BBC Radio 2.
19 October – Michael Parkinson announces he will leave his Sunday morning show, Parkinson's Sunday Supplement and the station after 11 years broadcasting. He will present his last show on 2 December.
1 December – Bob Harris returns.
2 December – Michael Parkinson hosts his last ever Parkinson's Sunday Supplement show, and leaves the station.
24 December – Ed Stewart rejoins for the last time and hosts his first ever Christmas Junior Choice show as Junior Choice broadcasts on Radio 2 for the first time.
Steve Lamacq and Bob Dylan join and Nick Barraclough and Richard Baker leave.

2008
Steve Harley leaves the station, after hosting his final Sounds of the 70s show.
Michael Ball joins, for the launch of Michael Ball's Sunday Brunch, who replaces Michael Parkinson.
17 March – Humphrey Lyttelton retires from radio broadcasting. He had presented Best of Jazz for the last 40 years.
9 April – Trevor Nelson joins, and brings his Rhythm Nation show to the station.
16 October – An episode of the Russell Brand Show, co-hosted by fellow BBC Radio 2 presenter Jonathan Ross is recorded for transmission at a later date. The show includes Brand and Ross leaving four prank messages on actor Andrew Sachs's answerphone including offensive remarks about his granddaughter and use of foul language. The programme is subsequently broadcast on Saturday 18 October, partially censored, having passed the various pre-transmission checks from the programme's editors. Initially the programme only receives a negligible number of complaints regarding Jonathan Ross' bad language; however, after the incident is reported a week later by The Mail on Sunday a public outcry soon ensues. The case is referred to both Ofcom and the BBC Trust and in the interim Ross and Brand are both suspended for 12 weeks from all BBC programmes pending investigation. Soon after these announcements Russell Brand announces his resignation, as Russell himself leaves the station. shortly followed by BBC Radio 2 controller Lesley Douglas. Jonathan Ross was suspended from the BBC without pay for 12 weeks.
30 October – Controller Lesley Douglas's resignation is announced, as she leaves the station.
Matthew Wright leaves, and Suzi Quatro and Claudia Winkleman join.

2009
24 January – Jonathan Ross returns to the station and the BBC after being suspended.
27 January – Bob Shennan is appointed as Controller following the resignation of Lesley Douglas. He will take up the position in February.
February – Bob Shennan replaces Lesley Douglas as Controller, as he joins the station.
13 March – The station confirms plans to overhaul its weekend schedule from April. This will include Paul O'Grady, Alan Carr and Emma Forbes joining the network to present shows, while the Saturday afternoon comedy hour will move to Thursday evenings, as Pick of the Pops with Dale Winton moves from Sunday afternoons to 1-3pm on Saturdays from 4 April. The changes will also see Johnnie Walker present Sounds of the 70s on Sunday afternoon.
5 April – 
Sounds of the 70s returns to the airwaves on a regular and permanent basis with Johnnie Walker as presenter. The programme and been on air on an ad hoc basis since 2000.
 Paul O'Grady joins to present a new Sunday teatime show – Paul O'Grady on the Wireless – as part of the weekend schedule changes.
25 April – The first edition of the Saturday evening show Going Out With Alan Carr is broadcast.
22 May – The BBC says that Jonathan Ross's show will no longer be broadcast live following complaints about a joke he made on an edition of the programme which some listeners interpreted as being anti-gay.
30 May – Mo Dutta leaves the station after 14 years of broadcasting.
31 May – Pete Mitchell leaves the station to join Radio X and later Absolute Radio and Virgin Radio UK. 
6 and 7 June – Zoe Ball and Emma Forbes both join the station to present the Saturday and Sunday weekend breakfast shows respectively.
26 July – Malcolm Laycock presents his final edition of Sunday Night at 10, as he leaves the station.
2 August – Clare Teal took over from Malcolm Laycock on Sunday nights.
15 August – Malcolm Laycock criticises the network's management for abandoning its older listeners and claims he was constructively dismissed by the station, although BBC Radio 2 denies this to be the case. Laycock resigned from his position following a long-running dispute with his producer over the content of his show, and because of issues regarding his salary.
7 September – Sir Terry Wogan announces that he will step down as host of The Radio 2 Breakfast Show on 18 December, as Sir Terry himself moves to weekends on 14 February 2010 next year.
18 December – After 28 years, (in 2 separate stints), Sir Terry Wogan presents his final breakfast show.
20 December – Michael Ball leaves his Sunday mid-morning slot for a while.
24 December – The final edition of Chris Evans Drivetime is broadcast ahead of Chris' move to The Radio 2 Breakfast Show.
Bob Dylan leaves.

2010s

2010
7 January – Jonathan Ross announces he will leave the BBC and the station when his contract ends in July.
11 January – 
Chris Evans takes over from Sir Terry Wogan as presenter of the breakfast show. The programme's launch also sees the return of newsreader Moira Stuart to the BBC after two years away. 
Simon Mayo takes over the drivetime show and Matt Williams joins.
14 February – Sir Terry Wogan rejoins the station for the last time, to host his Sunday mid-morning show Weekend Wogan.
11 March – BBC Radio 2 confirms plans to overhaul its schedule from April. This will include moving two of its longest-running shows, Big Band Special and The Organist Entertains to different time slots, and switching its comedy hour from Thursday to Saturday evenings – the second time it has done this in 12 months.
30 March – Desmond Carrington's show broadcasts for the last time on Tuesday evenings, as it moves to Friday evenings from 9 April. Jamie Cullum's Jazz show replaces Carrington's in this slot from 6 April.
April – Emma Forbes leaves.
6 April – Jamie Cullum joins.
9 April – Desmond Carrington hosts his first Friday evening edition of The Music Goes Round.
30 April – It is reported that Emma Forbes has quit as co-host of the Saturday night show Going Out with Alan Carr after a disagreement with her bosses over time off.
5 July – The BBC Trust rejects BBC plans to close the digital stations BBC Radio 6 Music and BBC Asian Network saying there is not a strong enough case for closure.
17 July – Jonathan Ross leaves the station for a while.
3 September – BBC Radio 2 announces that presenter Sarah Kennedy had left the network after 17 years of broadcasting. By then she had been absent from the show for a few weeks and would not return to the programme (as Sarah herself retires from broadcasting), before the schedules were reorganised in October. Lynn Parsons acts as the show's stand-in presenter for its remaining time on air.
24 September – It is announced that Tony Blackburn will join the station on a permanent basis, taking over from Dale Winton on Pick of the Pops on Saturday afternoons. He begins on 6 November.
2 October – Graham Norton joins, and takes over the Saturday morning show from Jonathan Ross.
30 October – Dale Winton presents his final Pick of the Pops programme and leaves the station.
6 November – Tony Blackburn joins the station, and replaces Dale Winton as the regular host of Pick of the Pops.
24 December – Mark Lamarr leaves.
Suzi Quatro leaves and Bill Kenwright joins.

2011
Dave Pearce joins the station to host a weekly dance music show. Dave Pearce's Dance Years will air on Saturday evenings.
17 January – Vanessa Feltz joins, and takes over Sarah Kennedy's early morning show.
31 January – BBC Radio 2 announces the cancellation of its annual Electric Proms season after five years, citing financial considerations.
23 March – Radcliffe and Maconie Show broadcasts on BBC Radio 2 for the final time. 
2 April – Huey Morgan joins.
4 April – Jo Whiley joins the station on a permanent basis, after she left BBC Radio 1 to present a new Monday to Thursday weekday evening show. She replaces Mark Radcliffe and Stuart Maconie.
22 June – BBC Radio 2 hosts 2DAY, a day of 12 hour-long programmes to promote some of the station's specialist output normally reserved for evenings and weekends.
28 August – Alan Titchmarsh presents the final edition of Melodies for You, as he leaves the station. The programme, dedicated to popular classic and light music, and part of the station's Sunday schedule since it launched in 1967, was scrapped as the station wanted to change its format for representing the genres.
11 September – The first ever Radio 2 Live in Hyde Park music festival is held in London's Hyde Park.
Jonny Saunders leaves the station to become a teacher, and Vassos Alexander joins.

2012
Brian D’Arcy hosts his final The Sunday Hour show, and leaves the station to join BBC Radio Ulster.
28 January – Zoe Ball steps down from the Saturday weekend breakfast show hosting, as she leaves the station for a while. She will be replaced on 25 February by Anneka Rice.
25 February – Anneka Rice joins, and replaces Zoe Ball on Saturday weekend breakfast.
6 February – Diane-Louise Jordan joins, and replaces Brian D’Arcy as host of The Sunday Hour.
6 March – Alan Carr announces his intention to quit his show Going Out with Alan Carr so he can devote more time to his television career.
31 March – Going Out With Alan Carr broadcasts for the final time, as Alan Carr and Melanie Sykes both leave the station.
14 April – 
BBC Radio 2 airs a minute-by-minute account of the sinking of the RMS Titanic to coincide with the 100th anniversary of the disaster.
12 May – Liza Tarbuck joins, replacing Alan Carr and Melanie Sykes and begins presenting her first regular show.
September – BBC Radio 2 ends the practice of having its own team of newsreaders. This role was taken on by journalists. As a result, Colin Berry and Charles Nove both leave – Berry had been a newsreader for the station since 1973.
17 October – BBC Radio 2 axes folk presenter Mike Harding after 15 years with the network. He will host his last show on 26 December.
26 December – Mike Harding leaves.
Aled Jones leaves the station to join Classic FM and BBC Radio Wales and also to rejoin BBC Radio 3.
Carol Kirkwood joins the station, as the station's first official The Radio 2 Breakfast Show weather news reporter.

2013
2 January – Mark Radcliffe takes over Mike Harding's Wednesday night folk music show.
20 January – The Sunday Hour is doubled in length but moves from Sunday evenings to Sunday mornings, At the same time Clare Balding joins the station, and takes over from Aled Jones as host of Good Morning Sunday, and Michael Ball hosts his first ever Sunday night show.
4 August – After a career with the BBC Light Programme & later BBC Radio 2 spanning more than 40 years, David Jacobs retires. He dies almost a month later
5 October – Sara Cox joins the station, to host Sounds of the 80s, a new programme dedicated to hits of the 80s.
1 November – Paul Gambaccini's America's Greatest Hits was suspended from its Saturday night slot after the presenter was arrested as part of the Operation Yewtree investigation. Gambaccinini himself took the decision not to go on air following media interest in his arrest. Gambaccini returned to the station a year later after it is decided that he will face no charges.
Don Black joins.
Stuart Maconie and Steve Lamacq both leave the station to rejoin BBC Radio 6 Music.
Big Band Special broadcasts for the final time.
Jules Lang joins the station, as the station's first official stand-in travel news reporter when regular travel presenters are away.
Trevor Nelson rejoins on permanent basis, after he left BBC Radio 1

2014
February – Sara Cox rejoins on permanent basis, after she left BBC Radio 1.
7–10 April – As part of the BBC's celebration of the 20th anniversary of Britpop, Steve Lamacq and Jo Whiley present a week of former BBC Radio 1's long running The Evening Session on BBC Radio 2.
8 May – BBC Radio 2 launches its very first pop DAB station BBC Radio 2 Eurovision. It returned a year later to cover the 2015 contest.
8 & 10 August – Sally Boazman presents her final travel news reports for weekdays, as she moves to weekends, and Bobbie Pryor presents her final travel reports for weekends, as she moves to weekdays.
11 & 16 August – Bobbie Pryor presents her first travel reports for weekday afternoons, Orna Merchant joins the station as the new travel news reporter for weekends, and Sally Boazman presents her first travel reports for weekends.
15 August – Jonathan Ross returns after four years away.
October – Radio 2 stops broadcasting a full overnight schedule for a while as part of cost-cutting measures. The 3am to 5am weeknight slot broadcasts repeats of weekly shows.
Lynn Parsons, Dave Pearce, Fran Godfrey and Richard Allinson leave, and Craig Charles and Ana Matronic join.

2015
5–8 March – BBC Radio 2 launches its second pop-up station – BBC Radio 2 Country to cover the annual C2C: Country to Country festival. The station returned to cover the 2016 and 2017 event.
27 March – Newsreader and continuity announcer Alan Dedicoat presents his final bulletins for the network after 28 years of broadcasting, as he retires from the station.
8 November – Sir Terry Wogan hosts his last ever and final Weekend Wogan show, and leaves the station due to ill health and before his death next year.
17 December – Rebecca Pike leaves.
25 December – Ed Stewart hosts his last ever Christmas Junior Choice programme and leaves the station before his death next year.

2016
25 February – Tony Blackburn was dismissed by the BBC and Mark Goodier takes over as temporary host of Pick of the Pops.
April – BBC Radio 2 broadcasts its third pop-up station – BBC Radio 2 50s.
3 April – Michael Ball hosts his final Sunday night show, as he moves back to Sunday mid-mornings.
10 April – Michael Ball returns to the Sunday mid-morning slot, replacing Sir Terry Wogan (who died in January).
15 April – Sounds of the 80s moves to Fridays.
16 April – Craig Charles's House Party show broadcasts for the first time.
24 April – Claudia Winkleman hosts her first ever Sunday night show.
9 July – Paul Gambaccini becomes the host of Pick of the Pops.
July – Trevor Nelson brings his Rhythm Nation r&b show to Saturday weekend nights. He had previously presented a Wednesday weekday evening Rhythm Nation soul show for the station, and Fearne Cotton joins.
28 October – Desmond Carrington presents his final show, after 36 years of broadcasting. as he retires from the station.
31 December – Tony Blackburn returns, and was rehired by the BBC.

2017
6 January – Tony Blackburn's The Golden Hour broadcasts for the first time, after Blackburns's return to BBC Radio 2 from New Year's Eve 2016.
9 January – BBC Radio 2 announces that all remaining overnight live programming will be dropped for a while as part of cost-cutting measures. Consequently, the After Midnight programme, will be axed in favour of repeats of shows such as Sounds of the 60s and Pick of the Pops, while an automated service titled Radio 2 Playlists will air in the 2am5am slot.
21 January – Dermot O'Leary hosts his final Saturday mid-afternoon show.
26 January – Janice Long leaves the station to join BBC Radio Wales and Greatest Hits Radio.
29 January – Alex Lester leaves the station to join BBC Local Radio and Greatest Hits Radio.
1 February – Clare Teal presents Desmond Carrington – All Time Great, a special tribute show celebrating the life of Desmond Carrington during his time with the station.
25 February – Brian Matthew presents his final edition of Sounds of the 60s for BBC Radio 2, following his retirement due to ill health, and Anneka Rice hosts her final Saturday weekend breakfast show as Anneka herself leaves the station for a while.
4 March – Tony Blackburn succeeds Brian Matthew as presenter of BBC Radio 2's Sounds of the 60s. The two-hour show also moves to the earlier time of 6am, and Zoe Ball rejoins the station on permanent basis to host a new Saturday mid-afternoon show, while Dermot O'Leary takes over from Anneka Rice on Saturday weekend breakfast.
26 March – Bob Harris presents his final weekend overnight show.
1 April – Anneka Rice rejoins the station on permanent basis to host her new Saturday weekend late-night show The Pick of Radio 2 
2 April – Ana Matronic presents her first ever Sunday weekend late-night Disco & Dance Devotion show
9 June – Gary Davies joins, and returns to BBC Radio after 23 years away.
9 July – Diane-Louise Jordan presents The Sunday Hour for the final time as she leaves the station, she is replaced the following week by Kate Bottley who joins the station.
30 September – The 50th anniversary of the launch of BBC Radio 2 (and BBC Radio 1) is celebrated. The two stations air a joint 90-minute show presented by Nick Grimshaw and Tony Blackburn, and BBC Radio 2 reconstructs the very first BBC Radio 1 show on Sounds of the 60s.
26 November – Clare Balding hosts Good Morning Sunday for the final time as she leaves the station.
25 December – Anneka Rice presents her first ever Christmas Junior Choice programme, replacing Ed Stewart (who died last year).

2018
Paul Jones leaves and Cerys Matthews and Angela Scanlon join.
4 January – Jonathan Ross leaves.
28 January – After nearly 78 years on air, The Sunday Hour is broadcast on BBC Radio 2 for the final time.
4 February – Good Morning Sunday is relaunched and extended into a three-hour programme, presented by Kate Bottley and Jason Mohammad as Jason himself joins the station.
29 March – Lynn Bowles who has been reading travel news on weekday mornings for the station since 2000 leaves the station to rejoin BBC Radio Wales, and she is replaced the following week by Rachel Horne who joins the station as the new travel news presenter for weekday mornings.
8 May – Long running specialist music programmes The Organist Entertains and Listen to the Band are broadcast for the final time, the former had been on air since 1969 as Nigel Ogden and Frank Renton both leave the station.
10 May – The final edition of the Radio 2 Arts Programme is broadcast, ending after 28 years on air.
11 May – Sara Cox steps down from Sounds of the 80's hosting. 
14 May – A new weekday evening and overnight schedule launches. Jo Whiley joins Simon Mayo to present an extended drivetime show as Matt Williams himself leaves the station while Jo's evening slot was occupied by specialist music and documentaries. Sara Cox launches a new Monday to Thursday late-night show and live overnight broadcasting returns with a new midnight to 3am show presented by OJ Borg as OJ himself joins the station.
18 May – Gary Davies replaces Sara Cox as presenter of Sounds of the 80s.
18 June – The Radio 2 Rock Show with Johnnie Walker broadcasts for the first time.
3 September – Chris Evans reveals live on air that he is to leave The Radio 2 Breakfast Show and the station at the end of the year. 
3 October – Mark Radcliffe takes a break from his radio broadcasting for a while to receive treatment for tongue cancer and lymph nodes, and it is announced that Zoe Ball will take over as presenter of The Radio 2 Breakfast Show in January 2019.
22 October – Radio 2's unpopular Drivetime Show with Simon Mayo and Jo Whiley is to end at the end of the year after a backlash from listeners, Jo Whiley will move back to an evening slot in January 2019, while Simon Mayo will leave BBC Radio 2 but he will continue his BBC Radio 5 Live film review programme. 
29 October – It is announced that Sara Cox will replace Simon Mayo on drivetime and the show will move back to its two-hour slot at 5pm to 7pm in January 2019. 
8 November – It is announced that Rylan Clark will replace Zoe Ball on Saturday mid-afternoons in January 2019.
13 December – Sara Cox hosts her final Monday to Thursday late-night show.
14 December – Moira Stuart reads the news on BBC Radio 2 for the final time as she leaves the station to join Classic FM.
17 December – The Radio 2 Rock Show with Johnnie Walker broadcasts its final Monday night show as it moves to weekends.
21 December – Simon Mayo leaves.
22 December – Zoe Ball presents her final Saturday mid-afternoon show as she moves to weekdays. 
24 December – After presenting The Radio 2 Breakfast Show for the past eight years, Chris Evans presents the final edition of The Chris Evans Breakfast Show on BBC Radio 2 as he leaves the station to join Virgin Radio UK and Vassos Alexander and Rachel Horne both leave.

2019
12 January – Trevor Nelson hosts his final Saturday night Rhythm Nation show as he moves to weekdays. 
14–19 January 
Zoe Ball takes over as presenter of The Radio 2 Breakfast Show as Richie Anderson, (the new travel news reporter for weekday mornings), Mike Williams (the new sports reporter) and Tina Daheley all join the station.
Other major changes to the schedule take place. Sara Cox replaces Simon Mayo as presenter of the drivetime show. The programme returns to its two-hour format from 5pm to 7pm and Sara Cox's Half-Wower feature broadcasts for the first time. Jo Whiley follows with the return of her Monday to Thursday evening show, the specialist music programmes move to 9pm and Trevor Nelson replaces Sara Cox as presenter of the Monday to Thursday late-night show with his show Rhythm Nation. Weekend changes see Rylan Clark replacing Zoe Ball as host of the Saturday mid-afternoon show as Rylan himself joins the station and the Saturday evening slot being filled by some of the displaced weeknight specialist shows, as The Radio 2 Rock Show with Johnnie Walker now moves to Saturday nights.
25 January – BBC Radio 2 confirms that Johnnie Walker will take a break from his radio broadcasting for a while to receive treatment for a heart condition.

2020s
2020
19 March – BBC Radio 2 launches its fourth decades show, Sounds of the 90s presented by Fearne Cotton, a new show dedicated to hits of the 90s.
28 March – Huey Morgan takes a break from his Radio 2 broadcasting for a while and The Radio 2 Rock Show with Johnnie Walker takes a break from the Radio 2 airwaves for a while.
29 March – Claudia Winkleman and Angela Scanlon both take a break from their radio broadcasting for a while.
 April – Due to COVID-19, BBC Radio 2's news bulletins come from BBC Radio 5 Live. Three minute bulletins are broadcast on the hour with extended five minute bulletins at breakfast and on weekday early evenings.
19 December – Graham Norton presents his final Saturday mid-morning show and leaves the station to join Virgin Radio UK.

2021
3 January – Clare Teal presents her final edition of The Swing and Big Band Show and leaves the station after 15 years of broadcasting. and Anneka Rice hosts her final Sunday late-night show as she also leaves the station.
4 January – Vanessa Feltz's show begins at a new time at 4am. and Jo Whiley's Shiny Happy Playlist feature broadcasts on her weekday Monday to Thursday evening show for the first time.
27 February – Claudia Winkleman returns, and becomes the new presenter of the Saturday mid-morning show replacing Graham Norton.
6 April – The Radio 2 Breakfast Show begins a new jingles package produced by Wise Buddah Productions. The company have also created new jingles for Claudia Winkleman's Saturday mid-morning show.
9–11 April – Following the death of Prince Philip, Duke of Edinburgh, BBC Radio 2 abandons half its regular Friday, Saturday, and Sunday weekend programming in favour of simulcasting the BBC Radio News special programme and from 5pm the station broadcasts a revised schedule for the rest of the day and over the weekend.

2022
13 February – Paul O'Grady takes a break from his radio broadcasting for a while. His show, Paul O'Grady on the Wireless, will return on 22 May 2022.
14 February – Trevor Nelson's Magnificent 7 feature broadcasts on his Monday to Thursday Rhythm Nation late-night show for the first time.
20 February – Rob Beckett joins, and presents a new Sunday teatime show which will share its slot with Paul O'Grady's show.
8 April – BBC Radio 2 celebrates the launch of its BBC Sounds service Radio 2 90s with a day of 90s music.
14 May – BBC Radio 2 broadcasts live coverage of Eurovision 2022 in Turin.
15 May – Rob Beckett leaves, and will return in August.
22 May – Paul O'Grady returns, and Dr Rangan Chatterjee hosts his final Sunday late-night show as he leaves the station.
18 June – Craig Charles hosts his final House Party show as he leaves the station to rejoin BBC Radio 6 Music.
19 June – Ana Matronic hosts her final Disco & Dance Devotion show as she leaves the station.
1 July – Steve Wright announces he will step down from his afternoon show in September. He will be replaced by Scott Mills. Wright will continue to present Sunday Love Songs for the station, while his afternoon co-presenters, Janey Lee Grace and Tim Smith, will both leave the station. Mills' new show will air from 2–4pm, giving Sara Cox an extra hour on her drivetime show.
8–9 July – Tony Blackburn's  Golden Hour broadcasts its final Friday night show as it moves to Sundays, Sounds of the 80s also broadcasts its final Friday night show as it moves back to Saturday, Sounds of the 90s also broadcasts its final Friday night show as it also moves to Saturday, and The Radio 2 Rock Show with Johnnie Walker broadcasts its final Saturday night show as it moves to Friday. 
15–17 July – Radio 2 launches a new weekend schedule that sees Angela Griffin, DJ Spoony and Michelle Visage presenting regular shows as they join the station and Michelle Visage's Handbag Hits feature broadcasts on her Friday night show for the first time, The Radio 2 Rock Show with Johnnie Walker moves to Friday nights, Sounds of the 80s moves back to Saturday nights, Sounds of the 90s moves to Saturday nights, and Tony Blackburn's  Golden Hour moves to Sunday nights.
28 July – Vanessa Feltz announces that she will leave her early morning show the following day, and the station at the end of August after 11 years of broadcasting.
29 July – Vanessa Feltz hosts her final weekday early morning show.
1 August - An interim Early Breakfast Show begins airing, hosted by an array of guest presenters including Owain Wyn Evans, Nicki Chapman, Katie Piper and YolanDa Brown. 
9 August - It is announced that Paul O'Grady will step down from his Sunday afternoon show at the end of his current 13 week run.
14 August – Paul O'Grady presents his final Sunday afternoon show and leaves the station after 14 years of broadcasting.
8–19 September – Following the death of Queen Elizabeth II, BBC Radio 2 abandons half its regular scheduled programming in favour of simulcasting a BBC Radio News special programme. and the station broadcasts a revised schedule from 8 to 11 September and on 19 September the day of the funeral, & BBC Radio 2 Live in Leeds 2022 is cancelled.
30 September – Steve Wright hosts his final afternoon show, as Janey Lee Grace and Tim Smith both leave the station.
3-28 October – OJ Borg presents an interim weekday afternoon show on BBC Radio 2 between Wright's departure and Mills' arrival. 
4 October – It is announced that Owain Wyn Evans will replace Vanessa Feltz on the weekday Early Breakfast Show from January 2023. The show will be presented from Cardiff, making it the first weekday Radio 2 programme to move out of London.
31 October – Scott Mills begins presenting his weekday afternoon show and Sara Cox begins presenting a three hour version of her drivetime show.

2023
9 January - Results of the '21st Century Folk initiative launched in February 2022 are revealed along with plans for the station to celebrate Tony Blackburn's 80th Birthday. It is also announced that Phil Williams will present a new overnight show from 12am-3am every Monday as OJ Borg moves to four nights a week in the same slot. The start date of Owain Wyn Evans' tenure on the Early Breakfast Show is revised from January 2023 to 13 February 2023.
17 January - Ken Bruce announces that he will step down from his mid-morning show and leave the station by the end of March, after 31 years of broadcasting.
13 February - Owain Wyn Evans begins presenting his early breakfast show, the first show to be broadcast live from Cardiff on the station.
24 February - Vernon Kay is announced to be taking the weekday mid-morning slot from Ken Bruce in May. Bruce's last show is announced to be on 3 March 2023 with Gary Davies presenting during the interim. Plans are also announced for the station's Radio 2 Celebrates Country initiative including coverage of the C2C Festival. 
3 March - Ken Bruce presents his final mid-morning show.
6 March - Gary Davies begins presenting an interim mid-morning show and the Ten to the Top''' quiz feature broadcasts for the first time.

References

BBC Radio 2
Radio 2